Alexandria media may refer to:
Media in Alexandria, Minnesota
Media in Alexandria, Virginia